American Glory is a 2002 album of patriotic songs by Pat Boone issued post 9/11. The album was the biggest seller in Boone's in house label The Gold Label's history. The new song, "Under God," defended the use of those words in the Pledge of Allegiance.

References

Pat Boone albums
2002 albums